Csanád Novák (born 24 September 1994) is a Hungarian football player who plays for Nyíregyháza.

Club statistics

Updated to games played as of 28 April 2018.

References
 MLSZ 
 HLSZ 
 

1994 births
Living people
People from Tapolca
Hungarian footballers
Hungary youth international footballers
Hungary under-21 international footballers
Association football forwards
Győri ETO FC players
Kecskeméti TE players
Vasas SC players
Gyirmót FC Győr players
Mezőkövesdi SE footballers
Zalaegerszegi TE players
Szombathelyi Haladás footballers
Szolnoki MÁV FC footballers
Nyíregyháza Spartacus FC players
Nemzeti Bajnokság I players
Nemzeti Bajnokság II players
Sportspeople from Veszprém County